Czerwony Sztandar (English: "Red Banner", "Red flag") may refer to:

Czerwony Sztandar (Lviv newspaper) (1939-1941), Lviv, Ukraine 
 (1953-1990), Polish-language newspaper in Lithuanian SSR
 The title of the Polish version of the French revolutionary song The Standard of Revolt